The 2nd PMPC Star Awards for Television ceremony was held at the Smart Araneta Coliseum, Quezon City on October 15, 1988, and broadcast over ABS-CBN Channel 2. The ceremony was directed by Al Quinn.

Nominees 
These are the nominations for the 2nd Star Awards for Television. The winners are in bold.

Best TV station 
ABS-CBN-2
PTV-4
GMA-7
RPN-9
IBC-13

Best Drama Serial 
Agila (RPN 9)
Gintong Krystal (GMA 7)
Gulong ng Palad

Best Drama Series 
Balintawtaw (PTV 4)
Coney Reyes on Camera (RPN 9)
Lovingly Yours, Helen (GMA 7)
Maricel Regal Drama Special (ABS-CBN 2)
Princess (GMA 7)

Best Drama Actor 
Rey Abellana (K / IBC 13)
Robert Arevalo (Balintawtaw / PTV 4)
Ronald Corveau (Gulong ng Palad / RPN 9)
Juan Rodrigo (Banyuhay / RPN 9)
Roi Vinzon (K / IBC 13)

Best Drama Actress 
Precious Hipolito (Stop Child Abuse / ABS-CBN 2)
Princess Punzalan (Princess / GMA 7)
Coney Reyes (Coney Reyes on Camera / RPN 9)
Caridad Sanchez (Gulong ng Palad)
Aurora Sevilla (Agila / RPN 9)
Maricel Soriano (Maricel Regal Drama Special / ABS-CBN 2)
Helen Vela (Agila / RPN 9)

Best Comedy Show 
Chika Chika Chicks (ABS-CBN 2)
Goin' Bananas (ABS-CBN 2)
John en Marsha (RPN 9)
Hapi House (IBC 13)
Palibhasa Lalake (ABS-CBN 2)
Sic O'Clock News (IBC 13)
T.O.D.A.S.: Totally Outrageous Delightful All-Star Show (IBC 13)

Best Comedy Actor 
Joey de Leon (T.O.D.A.S.: Totally Outrageous Delightful All-Star Show / IBC 13)
Dolphy (John en Marsha / RPN 9)
Jaime Fabregas (Sic O'Clock News / IBC 13)
Joey Marquez (Palibhasa Lalake / ABS-CBN 2)
Roderick Paulate (Tipitipitim Tipitom / RPN 9)
Vic Sotto (Okay Ka Fairy Ko / IBC 13)
Lou Veloso (Pubhouse / IBC 13)

Best Comedy Actress 
Nida Blanca (John en Marsha / RPN 9)
Vangie Labalan (Ayos Lang, Tsong! / IBC 13)
Cynthia Patag (Palibhasa Lalake / ABS-CBN 2)
Tiya Pusit (Kasi Nga Babae)
Chanda Romero (Pubhouse / IBC 13)
Gloria Romero (Palibhasa Lalake / ABS-CBN 2)
Aiza Seguerra (Okay Ka Fairy Ko / IBC 13)
Nova Villa (Chika Chika Chicks / ABS-CBN 2)

Best Musical Variety Show 
Loveli-Ness (IBC 13)
Martin and Pops Twogether (ABS-CBN 2)
The Sharon Cuneta Show (ABS-CBN 2)
Superstar (RPN 9)
Vilma (GMA 7)

Best Variety Show 
Eat Bulaga! (RPN 9)
GMA Supershow (GMA 7)
Good Morning Showbiz (GMA 7)
Lunch Date (GMA 7)
That's Entertainment (GMA 7)

Best Female TV Host 
Nora Aunor (Superstar / RPN 9)
Sharon Cuneta (The Sharon Cuneta Show / ABS-CBN 2)
Pops Fernandez (Martin and Pops: Twogether / ABS-CBN 2)
Alma Moreno (Loveli-Ness / IBC 13)
Vilma Santos (Vilma / GMA 7)

Best Male TV Host 
Joey de Leon (The Sharon Cuneta Show / ABS-CBN 2)
Bert Marcelo (Loveli-Ness / IBC 13)
German Moreno (GMA Supershow / GMA 7)
Martin Nievera (Martin and Pops: Twogether / ABS-CBN 2)
Randy Santiago (Lunch Date / GMA 7)

Best Musical Special
25 + 1: A Double Celebration (GMA 7)
Aiza Seguerra: Bow (RPN 9)
Dolphy's Diamond Dragon (IBC 13)
The Heat is On (IBC 13)
Here's to the Ladies: Zsa Zsa Padilla Special (ABS-CBN 2)
Jose Mari Chan Special (RPN 9)
Your Evening With Pilita (RPN 9)

Best Public Service Program 
Bahay Kalinga (ABS-CBN 2)
Damayan (PTV 4)
Kapwa Ko Mahal Ko (GMA 7)
Pananagutan

Best Public Service Program Host 
Ben Canlas and Tina Ferreros (Pananagutan)
Cielo del Mundo (Kapwa Ko, Mahal Ko / GMA 7)
Mike Lacanilao and Mel Tiangco (Bahay Kalinga / ABS-CBN 2)
Rosa Rosal (Damayan / PTV 4)

Best Game Show 
Date a Star (GMA 7)
Family Kuarta o Kahon (RPN 9)
Game na Game (ABS-CBN 2)
Just for Fun (GMA 7)
Super Swerte sa Nueve (RPN 9)

Best Game Show Host 
Jackie Lou Blanco, Cynthia Patag and Mark Gil (Date a Star / GMA 7)
Tirso Cruz III and Pinky Marquez (Game na Game / ABS-CBN 2)
Joey de Leon (Super Swerte sa Nueve / RPN 9)
Roderick Paulate (Just for Fun / GMA 7)
Pepe Pimentel (Family Kuarta o Kahon / RPN 9)

Best Talent Program 
Ang Bagong Kampeon (RPN 9)
Sali Kami
Tawag ng Tanghalan (ABS-CBN 2)

Best Talent Program Host 
Pilita Corrales and Bert Marcelo (Ang Bagong Kampeon / RPN 9)
Frankie Evangelista, Nanette Inventor and Danny Javier (Tawag ng Tanghalan / ABS-CBN 2)
Helen Gamboa and Tito Sotto (Sali Kami)

Best Educational Program 
Ating Alamin (PTV 4)
Beauty Secrets (IBC 13)
Cooking with Nora Daza (ABS-CBN 2)
Lutong Bahay (RPN 9)
Tele-Aralan ng Kakayahan (PTV 4)

Best Educational Program Host 
Nora Daza (Cooking with Nora Daza / ABS-CBN 2)
Cecilia Garuncho (Tele-Aralan ng Kakayahan / PTV 4)
Gerry Geronimo (Ating Alamin / PTV 4)
Ricky Reyes (Beauty Secrets / IBC 13)
Tita Betty (Lutong Bahay / RPN 9)

Best Celebrity Talk Show 
Not So Late Night with Edu (ABS-CBN 2)
Oh No, It's Johnny! (ABS-CBN 2)

Best Celebrity Talk Show Host 
Johnny Litton (Oh No, It's Johnny! / ABS-CBN 2)
Edu Manzano (Not So Late Night with Edu / ABS-CBN 2)

Best Magazine Show 
30/30 (IBC 13)
Apple Pie, Patis, Atbp. (RPN 9)
Isip Pinoy (RPN 9)
Magandang Umaga Po (ABS-CBN 2)
PEP Talk (ABS-CBN 2)
The Probe Team (GMA 7)
Showbiz Talk of the Town (RPN 9)
Travel Time (IBC 13)

Best Magazine Show Host 
Lee Andres (30/30 / IBC 13)
Susan Calo-Medina (Travel Time / IBC 13)
Noli de Castro (Magandang Umaga Po / ABS-CBN 2)
Joey de Leon (Apple Pie, Patis, Atbp. / RPN 9)
Cheche Lazaro (The Probe Team / GMA 7)
Portia Ilagan (Showbiz Talk of the Town / RPN 9)
Loren Legarda (PEP Talk / ABS-CBN 2)
Vic Sumulong (Isip Pinoy / RPN 9)

Best News Program 
GMA Balita (GMA 7)
GMA Headline News (GMA 7)
TV Patrol (ABS-CBN 2)
The World Tonight (ABS-CBN 2)

Best Male Newscaster 
Angelo Castro, Jr. (The World Tonight / ABS-CBN 2)
Noli de Castro (TV Patrol / ABS-CBN 2)
Frankie Evangelista (TV Patrol / ABS-CBN 2)
Mike Lacanilao (GMA Balita / GMA 7)
Jose Mari Velez (GMA Headline News / GMA 7)

Best Female Newscaster 
Loren Legarda (The World Tonight / ABS-CBN 2)
Tina Monzon-Palma (GMA Headline News / GMA 7)
Cathy Santillan (Newswatch Evening Edition / RPN 9)
Mel Tiangco (TV Patrol / ABS-CBN 2)
Helen Vela (GMA Balita / GMA 7)

Best Public Affairs Program 
Issues and Answers (GMA 7)
People's Privilege Hour (PTV 4)
Public Forum (IBC 13)
Straight from the Shoulder (GMA 7)
Tapatan Kay Louie Beltran (IBC 13)
Tell the People (RPN 9)
Viewpoint (GMA 7)
Weekend with Velez (GMA 7)
Womanwatch (PTV 4)

Best Public Affairs Program Host 
Louie Beltran (Straight from the Shoulder / GMA 7)
Louie Beltran (Tapatan Kay Louie Beltran / IBC 13)
Art Borjal (Issues and Answers / GMA 7)
Nikki Coseteng (Womanwatch / PTV 4)
Randy David (Public Forum / IBC 13)
Alice Reyes (People's Privilege Hour / PTV 4)
Jose Mari Velez (Weekend with Velez / GMA 7)
Julie Yap-Daza (Tell the People / RPN 9)

Best Movie Talk Show 
Cinemascoop (ABS-CBN 2)
Eye to Eye (GMA 7)
Rumors, Facts and Humors (ABS-CBN 2)
Showbiz Eye (IBC 13)

Best Movie Talk Show Host 
Inday Badiday (Eye to Eye / (GMA 7)
Boy de Guia (Cinemascoop / ABS-CBN 2)
Alfie Lorenzo (Rumors, Facts and Humors / ABS-CBN 2)
Lolit Solis (Showbiz Eye / IBC 13)

Best Children Show 
Batibot (RPN 9)
Penpen de Sarapen (RPN 9)
Kulit Bulilit (IBC 13)
Ora Engkantada (IBC 13)

Best Children Show Host 
Connie Angeles (Penpen de Sarapen / RPN 9)
Luz Fernandez (Ora Engkantada / IBC 13)
Bodjie Pascua (Batibot / RPN 9)

Special awards

Ading Fernando Lifetime Achievement Awardee 
Chichay
Dominic Salustiano

Best Cultural Musical Program 
Aawitan Kita

Most Promising TV Personality
Alice Dixson
Jenjon Otico
Melissa Perez Rubio
Whitney Tyson

See also 
PMPC Star Awards for TV

References 

PMPC Star Awards for Television